Edmonton-Meadows is a provincial electoral district in Alberta, Canada. The district was one of 87 districts mandated to return a single member (MLA) to the Legislative Assembly of Alberta using the first past the post method of voting. It was contested for the first time in the 2019 Alberta election.

Geography
The district is located in southeast Edmonton, containing the neighbourhoods of Jackson Heights, Kiniski Gardens, Minchau, Larkspur, Wild Rose, Silver Berry, Bisset, Daly Grove, Maple and Tamarack.

History

The district was created in 2017 when the Electoral Boundaries Commission recommended renaming Edmonton-Mill Creek, reflecting a change in boundaries that "leaves the part of Mill Creek most well-known to Edmontonians in the constituency of Edmonton-Gold Bar," as the northern boundary of the district moved southward to Highway 14. The western and southern boundaries saw adjustments as well.

Electoral results

References

Alberta provincial electoral districts
Politics of Edmonton